Gibraltar Cricket Board is the official national governing body of the sport of cricket in Gibraltar. Its current headquarters is at 1st Floor, GFSB, Irish Town, Gibraltar. Gibraltar Cricket is Gibraltar's representative at the International Cricket Council and is an Associate Member having been a member of that body since 1969. It is also a member of ICC Europe.

History

In April 2018, the ICC decided to grant full Twenty20 International (T20I) status to all its members. Therefore, all Twenty20 matches played between Gibraltar and other ICC members after 1 January 2019 will be a full T20I.

Gibraltar played their first T20I on 26 October 2019, against Spain, during the 2019 Iberia Cup.

See also

 Gibraltar national cricket team
 Sport in Gibraltar

References

External links
 Gibraltar Cricket web-site
Cricinfo Gibraltar

External links

Cricket administration
Cricket in Gibraltar
Cricket
1960 establishments in Gibraltar